() was a gunboat that served in the Finnish Navy during World War II. She was built in 1917. Finally, in 1920, the Germans handed her over to the Finns, who renamed her . After World War II, she served as a trawler in the Baltic Sea. She was scrapped in 1953.

Interwar period
 took part in the tragic autumn training cruise of the Finnish Navy in 1925 when the  foundered in heavy seas.  started leaking during the storm and when it finally reached the dock at Veitsiluoto its rear deck was already at sea level.

In September 1939  joined with the Finnish Coastal Fleet in vicinity of Åland to relieve  and later patrolled the northern Baltic Sea and the Sea of Åland together with her sister ship .

Winter War

When returning to Turku on 25 January 1940  damaged its propeller in the ice and had to be docked for repairs.

Continuation War

References

Citations

Bibliography
 
 
 

Ships of the Finnish Navy
World War II patrol vessels of Finland
Patrol vessels of the Finnish Navy